Kund is a village and one of the 51 Union Councils (administrative subdivisions) of Khushab District in the Punjab Province of Pakistan.  It is located at 32°24'40N 72°12'17E.

References

Union councils of Khushab District
Populated places in Khushab District